Marcos Vinícius dos Santos Gonçalves (born 24 May 1979), known as Marquinhos Santos, is a Brazilian football manager.

Career
Born in Santos, São Paulo, Santos played youth football for Santos FC as a midfielder, but never played professionally. In 1999 he moved to Curitiba, and started working in a small football school in the city called Sociedade Morgenau.

In 2003, Santos joined Atlético Paranaense, being in charge of the youth squads until 2009, when he joined Coritiba's under-20 squad. In 2011 he was appointed manager of the Brazil under-15 national team, and took over the under-17s in the following year, after Emerson Ávila was in charge of the under-20s.

On 6 September 2012, Santos returned to Coritiba, now being appointed first team manager after the dismissal of Marcelo Oliveira. He was dismissed roughly one year later, and was replaced by Péricles Chamusca.

Santos was announced as manager of Bahia on 12 December 2013, but was sacked the following 26 July after nine winless matches. On 24 August, he returned to Coxa, and managed to avoid relegation with the club.

Santos was appointed as manager of Vasco da Gama on 10 December 2014, but decided not to take over to family issues and remained at Coritiba. On 8 June of the following year, he was relieved from his duties at the latter club, after four consecutive defeats.

Santos spent the following three seasons managing clubs in the Série B and in the Série C, such as Fortaleza, Figueirense, Paysandu, Londrina, São Bento and Juventude. On 16 September 2019, he returned to the top tier after being named manager of Chapecoense, seriously threatened with relegation.

Santos returned to Ju for the 2020 season, but was relieved of his duties on 16 March 2020 after a poor start. On 4 February 2021, he returned to Juventude for a third spell.

Santos was dismissed by Juventude on 18 October 2021, after five winless matches, and took over fellow top-tier side América Mineiro just hours later. He left the latter on a mutual agreement on 11 April, with just one league match into the new season.

On 12 June 2022, Santos was announced as manager of Ceará, also in the top tier. He was sacked on 14 August, after 17 matches.

Managerial statistics

Honours

Club
Coritiba
Campeonato Paranaense: 2013

Bahia
Campeonato Baiano: 2014

Fortaleza
Campeonato Cearense: 2016

International
Brazil U15
South American U-15 Championship: 2011

References

External links
 
 

1979 births
Living people
Sportspeople from Santos, São Paulo
Brazilian football managers
Campeonato Brasileiro Série A managers
Campeonato Brasileiro Série B managers
Campeonato Brasileiro Série C managers
Brazil national under-17 football team managers
Coritiba Foot Ball Club managers
Esporte Clube Bahia managers
Fortaleza Esporte Clube managers
Figueirense FC managers
Paysandu Sport Club managers
Londrina Esporte Clube managers
Esporte Clube São Bento managers
Esporte Clube Juventude managers
Associação Chapecoense de Futebol managers
América Futebol Clube (MG) managers
Ceará Sporting Club managers